Đorđić (also transliterated Djordjic) is a Serbian surname. Notable people with the surname include:

 Bojan Đorđić (born 1982), Serbian-born Swedish football player
 Petar Đorđić (born 1990), Serbian handball player
 Ranko Đorđić (born 1957), Bosnian Serb football manager and former player
 Svemir Đorđić (born 1948), Serbian football player
 Zoran Đorđić (born 1966), former Serbian handball player

See also 
 Đorđević, a surname
 Đorđe, a given name

Serbian surnames
Patronymic surnames
Surnames from given names